Vidrà is a municipality in the comarca of Osona in Catalonia, Spain. It is situated in the valley of the Ges river, between the Bellmunt and Milany ranges, in the north of the comarca. It is linked to Sant Quirze de Besora by a local road. There are the roman churches of Sant Bartomeu de Covildases and of Santa Margarida de Cabagès in the municipal territory. Vidrà became part of Osona in the comarcal revision of 1990: previously it formed part of the Ripollès.

Demography

References

 Panareda Clopés, Josep Maria; Rios Calvet, Jaume; Rabella Vives, Josep Maria (1989). Guia de Catalunya, Barcelona: Caixa de Catalunya.  (Spanish).  (Catalan).

External links 
Official website 
 Government data pages 

Municipalities in the Province of Girona
Municipalities in Osona
Populated places in the Province of Girona